Alberto Pollio (21 April 1852 – 1 July 1914) was an Italian general, who was Chief of Staff of the Italian army from 1908 to his death.

Life and early career

Pollio was born in Caserta, son of Michele and Maria Oberty; at a young age he enrolled into the Nunziatella military school, then he attended the Military Academy of Modena, becoming in 1870 an artillery officer. In 1887 he was named aide de camp of King Umberto I, then from 1893 to 1897 military attache to the Italian embassy in Wien, then he was appointed commander of the Siena brigade and then of two different divisions of the Italian army. He wrote an essay on Napoleon and his Waterloo campaign, and one on the Battle of Custoza (1866), which drew praise even from abroad.

Chief of Staff 

In 1908, when the Chief of Staff of the Italian Army Tancredi Saletta retired, the position was offered to General Luigi Cadorna; however, he requested that his supreme authority be affirmed in peacetime as well as in wartime, and the leeway to appoint and release high officers at his discretion. This conditions proved unacceptable to the government and the First Adjutant of the King Roberto Brusati, and Pollio was named in his stead. During his tenure he oversaw the Italian expedition in Libya; considered a supporter of the Triple Alliance, he was held in high esteem by his German and Austro-Hungarian counterparts, Helmut Von Moltke and Conrad von Hötzendorf. Despite this, he also ordered new plans for mobilisation to be drawn in case of war against Austria-Hungary.

He died on 1 July 1914, just as World War I was about to begin; the circumstances of his death have led some authors to claim that the apparently austrophile general was actually murdered, to make way for Cadorna, who succeeded him as Chief of Staff.

Personal life 

Pollio was married with Eleonora Gormasz, an Austrian noblewoman.

References

1852 births
1914 deaths
Chiefs of Staff of the Italian Army
Italian generals
Italian military personnel of the Italo-Turkish War
Members of the Senate of the Kingdom of Italy
People from Caserta